Saint-Wenceslas, Quebec is a municipality in Nicolet-Yamaska Regional County Municipality, Quebec, Canada. The town is situated at a bend in the Bécancour River. The northern branch of Autoroute 55 terminated at the 9e rang of Saint-Wenceslas until its completion in October 2006. Route 161 also goes through the town.

The village church in Saint-Wenceslas was designed by Jean-Baptiste Louis Bourgeois, a local architect who also designed a Bahá'í House of Worship in the town of Wilmette, United States.

Demographics

See also
List of municipalities in Quebec

References

Municipalities in Quebec
Incorporated places in Centre-du-Québec
Designated places in Quebec
Nicolet-Yamaska Regional County Municipality